Dion Beebe A.C.S. A.S.C. (born 18 May 1968) is an Australian-South African cinematographer. Originally from Brisbane, Queensland, Australia, his family moved to Cape Town, South Africa in 1972. Dion studied cinematography at the Australian Film Television and Radio School from 1987 to 1989.

Beebe was nominated for an Academy Award and BAFTA for his work on Rob Marshall's Chicago, and won the 2006 Academy Award for his work on the director's later Memoirs of a Geisha. He is known for his use of stylized, highly saturated colour palettes and for his experimental use of high-speed digital video on Michael Mann's Collateral (for which he won a BAFTA for Best Cinematography) and Miami Vice. He is also a member of the Australian Cinematographers Society (ACS) and the American Society of Cinematographers (ASC). Dion was inducted into the Australian Cinematography Society's Hall of Fame at the National Awards on the 16 May 2020.

Filmography

Awards and nominations

References

External links
 
 How did that Oscar get there? interview with Dion Beebe in the Sydney Morning Herald (24 June 2006)

1968 births
Living people
Australian cinematographers
Australian Film Television and Radio School alumni
Artists from Cape Town
Best Cinematographer Academy Award winners
Best Cinematography BAFTA Award winners
People from Brisbane
South African cinematographers